The men's national basketball team of the United States won the gold medal at the 2008 Summer Olympics in Beijing, China. They qualified for the Olympics by winning the 2007 FIBA American Championship held in Las Vegas, Nevada. The team was nicknamed the "Redeem Team", a play on an alternative name for the legendary 1992 squad that was called the "Dream Team", and a reference to the fact that the United States came away with disappointing bronze medals during the 2004 Summer Olympics and the 2006 FIBA World Championship. Former Phoenix Suns chairman and CEO Jerry Colangelo was named managing director of the national team program by the USA Basketball Executive Committee in 2005. Kobe Bryant was named the team captain and Mike Krzyzewski was named the head coach of the 2008 team." An ESPN program, Road to Redemption, followed the team's preparations. Additionally, a Netflix produced documentary titled The Redeem Team was released in 2022.

The United States defeated Spain 118–107 in the final to win the gold. Dwyane Wade was the leading scorer for team USA averaging 16 points per game. The 2008 team has significance, as it reasserted the United States as the dominant country in terms of international basketball.  

The withdrawal of all major stars prior to the 2004 Olympics and an embarrassing performance of those young and inexperienced who were called to replace them prompted USA Basketball to change its approach to the formation of a national team. As a result, the organization initiated a long-term project that saw NBA players committing to play for the team long before the start of the 2008 Olympics (instead of hastily accepting invitations merely weeks prior to the start of the tournament). Many 2008 Olympians participated in the 2007 Americas championships, where the US won gold, thus qualifying for the Olympics. The final roster featured eleven NBA All-Stars, a Hall of Fame coach, and two NBA MVPs.

Record

Preliminary round

The team competed in Group B of the Preliminary Round.

Tournament bracket

Roster

References

External links

 USA Basketball, official site
 The Redeem Team, 2022 Netflix documentary

United States at the Olympic men's basketball tournament
United
Olympics